Kathleen Gertrud Ferrier (born 8 March 1957) is a former Dutch politician of Surinamese descent and development aid worker. She served as a member of parliament of Netherlands representing the party Christian Democratic Appeal (Christen-Democratisch Appèl) from 2002 to 2012.

Early life and education
Ferrier was born in Paramaribo in Suriname when it was a constituent country of the Kingdom of the Netherlands. She is a daughter of the first President of Suriname Johan Ferrier and a half-sister of Surinamese novelist Cynthia McLeod. Ferrier studied Spanish language and Spanish literature (with a specialization in modern Spanish American literature), Portuguese language and also development aid at Leiden University. She completed her masters' thesis on the Cuban poet Nicolás Guillén.

She is a member of the Protestant Church in the Netherlands (PKN).

Career
While Ferrier was an MP from 23 May 2002 to 19 September 2012, she focused on matters of development aid, education, public health, welfare and sports. In 2017, Ferrier joined Asian University for Women (AUW) as an honorary visiting professor.

Decorations 
 Knight of the Order of Orange-Nassau (2012).

References 

1957 births
Living people
Dutch anti-poverty advocates
Children of national leaders
Christian Democratic Appeal politicians
Dutch humanitarians
Women humanitarians
People in international development
Knights of the Order of Orange-Nassau
Leiden University alumni
Members of the House of Representatives (Netherlands)
People from Paramaribo
Protestant Church Christians from the Netherlands
Surinamese emigrants to the Netherlands
Dutch women activists
21st-century Dutch politicians
21st-century Dutch women politicians